The 1981 Atlantic Coast Conference baseball tournament was held in Chapel Hill, North Carolina, from April 22nd through April 26th.  won the tournament and earned the Atlantic Coast Conference's automatic bid to the 1981 NCAA Division I baseball tournament.

Tournament

See also
College World Series
NCAA Division I Baseball Championship

References

2007 ACC Baseball Media Guide

Tournament
Atlantic Coast Conference baseball tournament
Atlantic Coast Conference baseball tournament
Atlantic Coast Conference baseball tournament
College baseball tournaments in North Carolina
Baseball competitions in Chapel Hill, North Carolina